Vladyslav Mykolayovych Rybak (born 5 July 2001) is a Ukrainian professional footballer who plays as a goalkeeper for SC Dnipro-1, on loan from Metalist Kharkiv.

Career
Rybak, born in Kochubiyivka, Uman Raion is a product of neighbouring Youth Sportive School Uman and UTK Uman systems. After played at the amateurs level in his native village, he signed contract with the Ukrainian Premier League Zorya Luhansk.

In January 2022, Rybak joined Ukrainian First League club Metalist Kharkiv.

References

External links
 
 

2001 births
Living people
Sportspeople from Cherkasy Oblast
Ukrainian footballers
Association football goalkeepers
FC Zorya Luhansk players
FC Olimpik Donetsk players
FC Metalist Kharkiv players
SC Dnipro-1 players
Ukrainian Premier League players
Ukrainian First League players